TreadMarks is a distributed shared memory system created at Rice University in the 1990s.

References

External links
 TreadMarks official site

Distributed computing architecture